The Vagabond is a 3.7m fibreglass sailing dinghy is sailed in Australia . It is often used as a training boat due to its simplicity but also has the option of a symmetrical spinnaker. It was at one time made by De Havilland Marine Yacht Division. Series II, with a white top, flip up high aspect centreboard, and fully battened mainsail are currently being manufactured at Noosa in Queensland. There are a number of race events organised by the Vagabond Class Association including youth, state and national titles. This dinghy can be confused with the Vagabond 14 made by Hobie Cat and now called either a Holder 14 or Hobie-one. Jack Holt also designed a "Vagabond" dinghy of about the same size.

External links 

Noosa Yacht & Rowing Club have purchased the molds for the well known and proven Vagabond 3.7 Sailing Dinghy and start manufacture in Noosa..

Dinghies